Richard Avedon was an American fashion and portrait photographer.

Avedon may also refer to:
 Avedon (record producer), Dutch record producer
 Avedon (surname), a surname
 Avedon Carol (21st century), American feminist